BattleTech is an animated television series based on the BattleTech fictional universe, produced for syndication by Saban Entertainment in 1994.  Written by Robert N. Skir and Marty Isenberg, the series ran for 13 episodes and focused on the character of Adam Steiner, a military officer in the distant future who struggles to liberate his home planet from an attacking faction.

The series was noteworthy for its blending of animation techniques, with computer animation used to depict most battle sequences and traditional animation used for most other scenes.

Ownership of the series passed to Disney in 2001 when Disney acquired Fox Kids Worldwide which included Saban Entertainment. The series is not available on Disney+.

Story
The series takes place in the year 3050 as the Inner Sphere, the central region of settled interstellar space, is suddenly invaded by a powerful human faction identifying itself as the Clans.  One of the many planets that falls to the Clan onslaught is a small, mostly unimportant world in the Federated Commonwealth called Somerset.

Far away on the planet Tharkad, Major Adam Steiner, a teacher at the Nagelring Military Academy and native of Somerset, receives word of the attack on his homeworld and the loss of all communication with the forces there, including his brother Andrew.  Using his relationship to one of the Federated Commonwealth's ruling family, he gains permission to assemble a force to gather intelligence on the Clans and, if possible, liberate Somerset.

Unfortunately for Steiner, the only available JumpShip is the Katana, a Draconis Combine spacecraft recently seized for smuggling. The early episodes focus on Steiner recruiting and developing his team and reconciling differences between them, particularly between the Draconis JumpShip crew and the Federated Commonwealth soldiers, while gathering information about the Clans and their technology.

After several successes Steiner's unit is given BattleMechs enhanced with stolen Clan technology and begin offensive missions against the Clans, culminating in a Trial of Possession for the planet Somerset. Steiner wins the duel, but the Clan commander, honouring the letter of the deal, gives Steiner the planet but keeps the planet's population as prisoners. The series ends with Steiner vowing to rescue the people of Somerset.

Characters

1st Somerset Strikers
 Adam Steiner – An instructor at the Federated Commonwealth's prestigious Nagelring Military Academy and a native of the planet Somerset, Adam is a proponent of combined-arms tactics, unconventional warfare and cross-training in multiple fields of combat.  In addition to being a skilled tactician and BattleMech pilot, he also flies aerospace fighters.  After the Strikers' mission to Somerset, Adam plays an influential role in the Lyran Alliance and is eventually promoted to General of the Armies. When Tharkad is besieged during the Word of Blake Jihad, Adam is temporarily crowned Archon of the Lyran Alliance in order to keep the position out of enemy hands. Adam pilots AXM-2N Axman and AWS-9M Awesome 'Mechs.
 Rachel Specter – Adam's executive officer and close friend.  Rachel is an expert in electronics and communication and coordinates the Striker's actions in battle.
 Katiara Kylie – Also a native of Somerset, Katiara originally washed out of Adam's training program, but managed to make her way into the team, much to Ciro's displeasure.  Though not skilled with BattleMechs, she's a skilled aerospace fighter pilot.  Katiara pilots a Banshee aerospace fighter and Infiltrator BattleArmor.
 Ciro Ramirez – Born to a minor but prestigious family of MechWarriors, Ciro is a skilled pilot who's very set in his ways.  Ciro is captured by Clan forces early in the series, and eventually comes to accept their way of life, joining Clan Jade Falcon and fighting against his former teammates.  Ciro pilots WLF-2 Wolfhound and Timber Wolf 'Mechs.
 Zachary Miles "Hawk" Hawkins – A veteran MechWarrior who works with FedCom intelligence.  After capturing a Draconis Combine JumpShip for smuggling, he finds himself reassigned to it under Adam's command.  Initially distrustful not only of the Combine crewmen but also of his new commanding officer, he eventually comes to respect Adam's piloting and leadership abilities.  Hawk pilots an MAL-1R Mauler 'Mech. Post-series, he is mentioned as having a WLF-1 Wolfhound 'Mech in storage.
 Valten Ryder – A scoundrel of a MechWarrior, Val is hired by the Strikers on the planet of Dustball, where he worked for a local crime boss to retrieve his father's Centurion BattleMech.  Val is very much out for himself, but is surprisingly loyal to his friends.  Val pilots CN9-D Centurion and BSW-X1 Bushwacker 'Mechs.
 Franklin Sakamoto – Originally a smuggler for a Draconis Combine crime syndicate, Franklin overcomes his distrust of Adam to become one of the most valuable members of the Strikers, saving Prince Victor Steiner-Davion from an assassination attempt and becoming the first Inner Sphere BattleArmor trooper to destroy a Clan BattleMech.  During his time with the Strikers, Franklin discovers he is the illegitimate son of Theodore Kurita, the ruler of the Combine, and gets caught up against his will in an attempted coup against Kurita by the Black Dragon syndicate.  The plot fails, and Franklin renounces his claim to the Draconis throne to rejoin the Strikers.  After finishing his tour of duty, Franklin returns to the Combine where he is formally recognized by his father and joins the elite Otomo unit. During a revolt on the planet Luthien, Franklin is again captured by Black Dragon forces, and his unit vows to rescue him.  Franklin pilots Sloth BattleArmor, as well as AWS-9M Awesome and HTM-27T Hatamoto-Chi 'Mechs. He has also piloted the Banshee Aerospace fighter.

Clan Jade Falcon

 Nicolai Malthus - A Star Colonel and commander of the Falcon's Claws, an elite unit of Jade Falcon warriors. He's extremely ruthless in battle and arrogant in his dealings with others, even fellow Clan warriors. Seen to be one of Galaxy Commander Chistu's most reliable soldiers early on in the series, but as Malthus's obsession with destroying Adam Steiner grows throughout the series, he begins taking increasingly rogue actions. Pilots a Summoner M Omnimech.
 Kristen Redmond - Star Colonel, commander of the Black Vision cluster and Malthus's main rival. Pilots a Mad Dog Prime Omnimech.
 Pytor - Star Commander. At the age of 37 and lacking a Bloodname, he is considered old and useless by many of the younger breed of Clan Jade Falcon warriors, including his commander, Star Colonel Nicolai Malthus. Often relegated to humiliating garrison-type duties because of this disdain. Pilots a Hunchback IIC battlemech.
 Vandervahn Chistu - Galaxy Commander. Nicolai Malthus's commander and one of the few people capable of keeping him in check, though even that's not always a sure thing. Is seen to grow increasingly frustrated with Malthus's cavalier attitude late in the series. Unlike virtually every other Clan warrior in the series, he does not have Enhanced Imaging tattoos. He is never seen piloting a battlemech or Omnimech.
 Natalya - Holds the rank of Star Commander in the Falcons Claws. She is an Elemental, one of the Clans' genetically-bred infantry. Very little is revealed about her in the series, though in the book 1st Somerset Strikers, it is revealed that she is fiercely loyal to her commander, Nicolai Malthus, because she sees his exploits as her best shot for glory and a Bloodname. Pilots an Elemental battle armor suit.

Clan Wolf
Clan Wolf only appear in the "Road to Camelot" episode where they act as a rival to Clan Jade Falcons claims to the Camelot base. They do not appear in any other episode.

Episodes
 The Gathering Storm (September 10, 1994)
 Well Bargained and Done
 Warriors of Light and Steel
 Retribution
 Trade Secrets
 No Guts, No Galaxy (note: clip show)
 Protect and Survive
 In the Belly of the Beast
 Bound by Honor
 Road to Camelot
 Enemy of My Enemy
 Shadow Heir
 Homecoming
 Trial of Possession

Intro
Every episode begins with a voiceover and intro sequence narrated by Adam Steiner:

"This is the Inner Sphere - thousands of planets colonized by humankind. Once it was united under the Star League, but for the last three hundred years, it has been consumed by savage wars. Until a new enemy appeared - mysterious invaders known as "The Clans". Powerful and ruthless, they struck like lightning, attacking every sector at once! But they made one big mistake - they attacked my home planet! Now, in the spirit of the Star League, ancient enemies have reunited! And we're gonna take back our galaxy!"

Sourcebook
In 1995, FASA published 1st Somerset Strikers, a sourcebook companion for the animated series. The book provided background information on the BattleTech universe for viewers of the series, as well as stats and scenarios for use in the franchise's wargaming products, including BattleTech, MechWarrior, AeroTech and Battlespace.  The book also provided synopses for all 13 episodes and attempted to address the contradictions of the series with the established BattleTech canon.

References

 1st Somerset Strikers, FASA Corporation, 
 Classic BattleTech Technical Readout: 3058 Upgrade, Fanpro 
 Classic BattleTech Technical Readout: 3050 Upgrade, Catalyst Games

External links 
 

1994 American television series debuts
1994 American television series endings
BattleTech
Television series set in the future
Fox Broadcasting Company original programming
1990s American animated television series
Television series by Saban Entertainment
American children's animated action television series
American children's animated space adventure television series
American children's animated science fiction television series
Mecha animation
French children's animated action television series
French children's animated space adventure television series
French children's animated science fiction television series
Television series set in the 4th millennium
Military science fiction television series